Geratpur is a large village in Ahmedabad district in the Indian state of Gujarat.

Demographics
 India census, Geratpur had a population of 2,021. Males constitute 52.50% of the population and females 47.50%. Geratpur has an average literacy rate of 88.84%: male literacy is 94.40%, and female literacy is 82.69%. In Geratpur, 10.87% of the population is under 6 years of age.

Transport

Railway
Geratpur railway station is located on the Western Railway Ahmedabad – Vadodara Segment. It is 13 km from Ahmedabad, 86 km from Vadodara.

References

Villages in Ahmedabad district
Settlements in Gujarat